John W. Olmsted (1903–1986) was an American Rhodes scholar and historian of early modern Europe. He taught history at University of California, Los Angeles for 24 years and served as faculty representative to the Pacific Coast Conference for seven years. He also served as the first chairman of University of California, Riverside's Humanities Division.

Education
Olmsted attended Los Angeles Polytechnic and Alhambra high schools. Olmsted received a scholarship from L. L. Nunn to attend Deep Springs College before finally enrolling at University of California, Los Angeles in 1920. Olmsted played varsity tennis at UCLA before transferring to University of California, Berkeley during his junior year. Olmsted graduated Berkeley in 1925 as a member of Phi Kappa Sigma, Phi Beta Kappa, and Theta Tau with degrees in Engineering and Geology. He turned down a position as geologist with Union Oil Company and accepted a Rhodes scholarship.  Olmsted attended Oxford for a degree in history. While there, he played for their lawn tennis team, played Wimbledon in 1926, earned his "Blues" in 1927, and captained the team in 1928.

Teaching
Olmsted joined the faculty of UCLA in 1928 as an assistant professor of history and was promoted to full professor in 1951. From 1939 to 1945, Olmsted served as the faculty representative to the Pacific Coast Athletic Conference, acting as president of the conference in 1946. Olmsted also served as assistant to UCLA's Dean of Letters and Sciences, Gordon S. Watkins. When the University of California, Riverside created its College of Letters and Science in 1953, Olmsted was appointed by Watkins (UCR's first provost) as both a professor of history, the chairman of the humanities division, and the college's first faculty member. Olmsted was involved in many extracurricular activities. He was a member of the Pacific Coast Committee for the Humanities. He was a charter member of the Los Angeles chapter of Sigma Xi and he established the chapter of Phi Beta Kappa at UCR. Olmsted retired from teaching in 1970. Circa 2004 a new humanities building on the UCR campus, Olmsted Hall, was named in his honor.

Publications

Notes

References

University of California, Berkeley alumni
1903 births
1986 deaths
20th-century American historians
20th-century American male writers
American Rhodes Scholars
Alumni of Magdalen College, Oxford
Cornell University alumni
Deep Springs College alumni
John H. Francis Polytechnic High School alumni
People from Denver
University of California, Los Angeles faculty
University of California, Riverside faculty
Historians from California
American male non-fiction writers